Inga portobellensis is a species of plant in the family Fabaceae. It is found only in Panama.

References

portobellensis
Flora of Panama
Vulnerable plants
Taxonomy articles created by Polbot